Violent Silence is a Swedish progressive rock band. One of the more distinguishing features of the band is the fact that they include two keyboardists in the line-up and no guitarist. According to the German progressive rock site www.babyblaue-seiten.de, Violent Silence "has managed to create its own sound world and manage to sound both modern and timeless." The band's uniqueness has further brought it several positive reviews by a number of music magazines across the world, such as Eclipsed, Prog-Résiste, and Sweden Rock Magazine. They have released three studio albums to date, Violent Silence in 2003, Kinetic in 2005 and A Broken Truce in 2013. In the summer of 2020 band leader Johan Hedman finally announced that the fourth album, named  Twilight Furies, would be released in november 2020.

Members
Johan Hedman, drums, keyboards

Discography

  Twilight Furies (2020)
 A Broken Truce (2013)
 Kinetic (2005)
 Violent Silence (2003)

References
 
 Sweden Rock Magazine issue 39, October/November 2006, page 74
 http://www.babyblaue-seiten.de/index.php?content=band&bandId=1258

External links
 Official site
 Facebook fan page

Swedish progressive rock groups
Musical groups established in 2002
2002 establishments in Sweden
Musical groups from Uppsala